Sappy Birthday is a 1942 American film directed by Harry Edwards.

Plot summary

Cast 
Andy Clyde as Andy "Hole-in-One" Clyde
Matt McHugh as Hector – Andy's Brother-In-Law
Olin Howland as Mr. Plantem, Cemetery Plot Salesman
Esther Howard as Mrs. Andy "Martha" Clyde
Vernon Dent as Neighbor Policeman

Soundtrack

External links 

1942 films
1942 comedy films
Columbia Pictures short films
American black-and-white films
American comedy short films
Films directed by Harry Edwards (director)
1940s English-language films
1940s American films